Roy Lee Albern (October 10, 1933 – November 12, 1991), known by the ring name Ripper Collins, was an American professional wrestler who wrestled mainly during his career for 50th State Big Time Wrestling also known as NWA Hawaii.

Professional wrestling career
Collins started pro wrestling in Texas and later went to St. Louis. In 1961, he made his debut in the American Wrestling Association where he stayed until 1963.

NWA Hawaii (1965-1979)
Collins made his debut in 50th State Big Time Wrestling in 1965. He would stay there for most of his career as a heel.  He held the NWA Hawaii Tag Team Championship fourteen times from 1966-1973, 1978-1979 and the NWA Hawaii Heavyweight Championship seven times from 1966-1967, 1969-1971.

On January 19, 1966, he defeated Ron Reed for NWA Hawaii Heavyweight Championship. In August, he dropped it to Neff Maivia and recaptured the title in October. On March 15, 1967, he dropped it to Jim Hady. On October 29, 1969, Collins won the title from Pampero Firpo and would hold it multiple times from 1969-1971 feuding with Sam Steamboat. He would drop the belt to his former partner Johnny Barend in 1970 and would defeat Barend a month later. He dropped the belt to Frankie Laine on February 6, 1971.

On January 6, 1966, he and Johnny Barend won the NWA Hawaii Tag Team Championship defeating Luther Lindsay and Bearcat Wright. Collins would hold the belts fourteen times from 1966-1979 with Barend, Curtis Iaukea, "Crazy" Luke Graham, Buddy Austin, Mad Dog Mayne, Ed Francis, Johnny Valentine and Phil Whipper Watson Jr. On November 28, 1973, Collins and Valentine won the titles by defeating Sam Steamboat and Peter Maivia. The titles were then vacated and remained inactive until 1977. In 1978 Collins won the titles for the fourteenth and final time with Whipper Watson Jr. and dropped the titles in 1979.

In 1979, Collins left NWA Hawaii.

Later career
Collins also wrestled in All Japan Pro Wrestling in 1973. In 1976 he wrestled for Stampede Wrestling in Calgary, Canada where he would win the Stampede Wrestling International Tag Team Championship three times with Frenchy Martin, Bobby Bass and Larry Sharpe.

In 1980 he wrestled for NWA Polynesian and retired.

Personal life
He was married to female wrestler Barbara Baker. After retiring from wrestling, he resided in Hawaii.

Death
On November 12, 1991, Collins died of melanoma a form of skin cancer in Hawaii.

Championships and accomplishments
50th State Big Time Wrestling
NWA Hawaii Heavyweight Championship (8 times)
NWA Hawaii Tag Team Championship (14 times) – Johnny Barend (3), King Curtis Iaukea (4), "Crazy" Luke Graham (1), Buddy Austin (1), Lonnie Mayne (2), Ed Francis (1), Johnny Valentine (1), Whipper Watson Jr. (1) 
All Star Pro Wr estling
NWA Australasian Tag Team Championship (1 time) - with Larry O'Dea
Dominion Wrestling Union
NWA British Empire/Commonwealth Championship (1 time)
NWA Hollywood Wrestling
NWA "Beat the Champ" Television Championship (1 time)
Pacific Northwest Wrestling
NWA Pacific Northwest Heavyweight Championship (3 times)
Stampede Wrestling
Stampede Wrestling International Tag Team Championship (3 times) – Frenchy Martin (1), Bobby Bass (1), Larry Sharpe (1)
 World Championship Wrestling 
IWA World Heavyweight Championship (1 time)

References

External links
 
 

1933 births
1991 deaths
20th-century professional wrestlers
American male professional wrestlers
People from Muskogee, Oklahoma
Professional wrestlers from Oklahoma
NWA "Beat the Champ" Television Champions
Stampede Wrestling International Tag Team Champions
NWA Americas Tag Team Champions
IWA World Heavyweight Champions (Australia)